The ZB50 is a  motorcycle produced by Honda belonging to its Z Series family of mini bikes. The ZB50 is very similar to the Monkey-R and Monkey-RT which were marketed only in Japan in 1987 and 1988.

The ZB50 was available in 1988 in the United States, Canada and western Europe. Only 3058 were produced for the US market as the bike proved too expensive to mass-produce. The ZB50 was offered as a street and trail alternative to the Z50R, which was geared more towards dirt-track riders. The ZB50 is characterized by a perimeter twin spar frame, giving it the appearance of a miniature sportbike.

Specifications

Model information 
The ZB50 is a street legal motorcycle, powered by a 4-stroke 49 cc overhead cam engine. Unlike the Z50R, the ZB50 engine features a roller bearing camshaft, an automatic cam chain tensioner, and a NGK CR6HS spark plug.[1]

The electrical system is 12 volt and the ignition is a solid state electronic CDI.[1]

The carburetor has stock settings of 1-3/4 turns out for the air screw, the jet needle is set at the 3rd groove from the top, the float level is 18 mm, and it has a #75 main jet.[1]

The transmission is 3-speed constant mesh, with a 3-up shift pattern, it uses a wet multi-plate centrifugal clutch, with the following gear ratios: 1st 3.272, 2nd 1.823, and 3rd 1.190. It has a primary reduction ratio of: 4.058, and a secondary reduction ratio of 2.6 via the chain drive (15 tooth front sprocket and 39 tooth rear sprocket).[1]

Canadian and U.S. versions differ by the speedometer units, where Canadian speedometers use metric units, and U.S. speedometers use English units [1]
The Western-Europe versions differ, accordingly to the country they are meant for with 
-headlight
-headlight brackets
-fenders
-tail
-plateholder(Netherlands)

References
1. 1988 Honda ZB50 Service Manual

ZB50
Minibikes
Motorcycles introduced in 1987